Gujarat Adani Institute of Medical Sciences (GAIMS) is a self-financed medical college cum multi-specialty hospital established by the Government of Gujarat and  Adani Foundation in Bhuj city of Gujarat state. GAIMS is affiliated to Krantiguru Shyamji Krishna Verma Kachchh University. Gujarat Adani Institute of Medical Sciences (GAIMS) is first Public-Private-Partnership (PPP) endeavour between Government of Gujarat and Adani Education & Research Foundation. GAIMS is the only Medical College and Multi-Specialty Modern Teaching District Hospital in Kachchh District.

Government of Gujarat entered in agreement with Adani Foundation for establishing Medical College in Kachchh region and handing over the operations of G. K. General Hospital,Bhuj. Gujarat Adani Institute of Medical Sciences (GAIMS) – medical college is established since 2009

History 
Under the unique PPP model high tech medical college was established since 2009 in Bhuj.

In affiliation with Krantiguru Shyamji Krishna Verma (KSKV) Kachchh University, GAIMS is recognized by Medical Council of India (MCI) for Undergraduate course Bachelor of Medicine and Bachelor of Surgery (MBBS) with annual intake of 150 seats. In addition GAIMS is permitted by MCI for 15 different MD/MS Post Graduate courses with total annual intake of 51 seats in various specialities.

G. K. General Hospital (GKGH) is the attached teaching Government hospital which is the only Multi-Specialty Modern Teaching District Hospital in Kachchh district.

GKGH provides treatment to all classes of patients particularly poorest of poor patients. GKGH has more than 750 beds, 14 operating theatres, various intensive care units - ICU, ICCU, PICU, NICU, RICU, MICU, and SICU – totallying 58 beds, a modern radiology center with a 1.5 tesla MRI machine, 16 slice CT scan machine and other infrastructure facilities.

The District Hospital of Kutch, G K General Hospital, Bhuj was completely collapsed in major earthquake happened in January 2001. In the aftermath of the disaster, the Government of India decided to rebuild the hospital with latest technology known as the Base Isolation Technique a technique known for Earth Quake resistant structural building.

Government of Gujarat entered in agreement with Adani Foundation for establishing Medical College in Kachchh region and handing over the operations of G. K. General Hospital, Bhuj. Gujarat Adani Institute of Medical Sciences (GAIMS) – medical college is established since 2009.

College 
The entire campus spreads in total 27 acres of land in the middle of the Bhuj City which consists various blocks of Medical College, Teaching Hospital, Hostels for UG / PG students separate blocks for boys and girls, Residential quarters for teaching and non-teaching staff.

References

Hospitals in Gujarat
Medical colleges in Gujarat
Education in Kutch district
Bhuj
Hospitals established in 2009
2009 establishments in Gujarat
Adani Group